George MacLachlan (February 7, 1881 – November 23, 1962) was a provincial level politician from Alberta, Canada. He was born in Glasgow, Scotland.

Early life
MacLachlan and his family would move to the area of Clyde, Alberta in 1904. The edge of his homestead would later be surveyed by the government and become part of Highway 2, when construction began in 1906. He began his political career on the municipal level when he was elected twice to the serve on the local council in 1907 and 1909. He served on the council with future premier Herbert Greenfield. George was especially interested in maintaining and improving the local roads.

Provincial politics
MacLachlan first ran for the Alberta Legislature and was elected as a United Farmers of Alberta candidate in the 1921 Alberta general election. He would enjoy a relatively long career in provincial politics serving 18 years and 4 terms in the Legislative Assembly. George was also the last of the United Farmers to serve as a member of the Assembly.

In the 1935 Alberta general election MacLachlan was defeated for the first time by almost 2000 votes in a landslide finishing 3rd to Harry Knowlton Brown of the Social Credit party. 
He would attempt to regain his seat running in the 1940 Alberta general election. He was returned to his 4th term in the Legislative Assembly, this time as an Independent. He defeated Brown by 100 votes on ballot transfer.

MacLachlan would be defeated again in the 1944 Alberta general election This time he was defeated by Robin Jorgenson from Social Credit. He retired from provincial politics after that.

External links
Century Settlers, Westlock museum

References 

1881 births
1962 deaths
United Farmers of Alberta MLAs
Independent Alberta MLAs
20th-century Canadian politicians
Politicians from Glasgow
Scottish emigrants to Canada